During the 1985–86 English football season, Leicester City F.C. competed in the Football League First Division, their third consecutive season at this level since promotion. A 19th-place finish in the final table was just enough to secure a fourth successive top flight campaign.

Season summary
In the summer of 1985, the transfer market was dominated by one deal with Gary Lineker's contract at Filbert Street expiring at the end of the last season: Lineker joined Everton in June for a club record sale of £800,000. Leicester started the 1985–86 season terribly with just 2 wins in their first 14 league games. Their only real highlight of the season was when the Foxes did the double over champions Everton and on the final day of the season, Leicester beat Newcastle United 2–0 at Filbert Street and with Ipswich Town losing at Sheffield Wednesday, it kept the Foxes in the top flight and sent Ipswich down.

Final league table

Squad

Transfers

In

Out

Transfers in:  £250,000
Transfers out:  £850,000
Total spending:  £600,000

References

Leicester City